is a railway station on the Rikuu East Line in the city of Ōsaki, Miyagi Prefecture, Japan, operated by East Japan Railway Company (JR East).

Lines
Ikezuki Station is served by the Rikuu East Line, and is located 32.4 rail kilometers from the terminus of the line at Kogota Station.

Station layout
Ikezuki Station has one island platform, connected to the station building by a level crossing. The station is unattended.

Platforms

History
Ikezuki Station opened on 19 April 1914. The station was absorbed into the JR East network upon the privatization of JNR on April 1, 1987.

Surrounding area
Japan National Route 47
Japan National Route 457
 Ikezuki Post Office

See also
 List of Railway Stations in Japan

External links

  

Railway stations in Miyagi Prefecture
Rikuu East Line
Railway stations in Japan opened in 1914
Ōsaki, Miyagi
Stations of East Japan Railway Company